Catalina y Sebastian  is a Mexican telenovela produced by TV Azteca and it was the first union for Silvia Navarro and Sergio Basañez as protagonists.
The series was then developed into another Mexican telenovela by the title of Contrato de Amor which stars Leonardo García and Ximena Rubio.

Cast
Silvia Navarro as Catalina
Sergio Basañez as Sebastian 
Sergio Kleiner as Gustavo Negrete
Claudia Islas as Adela
Regina Torné as Antonieta
Alberto Mayagoitia as Carmelo "El Capataz"
Antonio De Carlo as Padre Jerónimo
Jorge Luis Pila as Antonio
María Rebeca as Emilia
Christian Cataldi as Eduardo
Pilar Souza as Josefa
Fidel Garriga as Don Lupe Mendoza
Lili Blanco as Alicia
Kenia Gazcon as Silvia
Lissette Salazar as Jéssica
Eduardo Schillinsky as Ricardo
Hugo Ateo as Macario
Géraldine Bazán as Luisa Negrete
Araceli Chavira as Petra
Ninel Conde as Paty
Patricia Conde
Alejandra Lazcano as Martina Mendoza
Alma Martínez
Ranferi Negrete
Ramiro Orci
César Riveros

Theme Song
Title: "No Pedir Perdon"
Singer: Ana Gabriel

References

External links

 

1999 telenovelas
1999 Mexican television series debuts
1999 Mexican television series endings
Mexican telenovelas
TV Azteca telenovelas
Spanish-language telenovelas